Aleksandar Petrović (born December 8, 1987) is a Serbian professional basketball player who last played for Sveti Đorđe of the Second Basketball League of Serbia. Standing at  he plays at the power forward position.

External links
 Profile at realgm.com
 Profile at eurobasket.com

1987 births
Living people
Basketball players from Belgrade
Darüşşafaka Basketbol players
Ilysiakos B.C. players
KK Proleter Zrenjanin players
KK Sveti Đorđe players
BKK Radnički players
Serbian expatriate basketball people in Greece
Serbian expatriate basketball people in Hungary
Serbian expatriate basketball people in Italy
Serbian expatriate basketball people in Turkey
Serbian expatriate basketball people in North Macedonia
Serbian expatriate basketball people in Slovenia
Serbian expatriate basketball people in Spain
Serbian men's basketball players
Virtus Bologna players
Power forwards (basketball)